Events from the year 1989 in the United States.

Incumbents

Federal government 
 President: Ronald Reagan (R-California) (until January 20), George H. W. Bush (R-Texas) (starting January 20)
 Vice President: George H. W. Bush (R-Texas) (until January 20), Dan Quayle (R-Indiana) (starting January 20)
 Chief Justice: William Rehnquist (Wisconsin)
 Speaker of the House of Representatives: Jim Wright (D-Texas) (until June 6), Tom Foley (D-Washington) (starting June 6)
 Senate Majority Leader: Robert Byrd (D-West Virginia) (until January 3), George J. Mitchell (D-Maine) (starting January 3)
 Congress: 100th (until January 3), 101st (starting January 3)

Events

January

 January 1 – The Canada–United States Free Trade Agreement comes into effect.
 January 4 – Second Gulf of Sidra incident: Two Libyan MiG-23 "Floggers" are engaged and shot down by two US Navy F-14 Tomcats.
 January 10 – Harris Trust and Savings Bank of Chicago settles a government enforcement action by agreeing to pay $14 million in backpay to women and minorities, the largest such settlement ever obtained from a single employer.
 January 11
 President Ronald Reagan delivers his farewell address to the nation.
 The National Collegiate Athletic Association adopts Proposition 42, which withdraws athletic scholarships from athletes who fail to meet minimal academic standards.
 January 12 – President-elect George H. W. Bush announces the final members of his cabinet, naming James D. Watkins as Secretary of Energy and William Bennett as the first director of the Office of National Drug Control Policy.
 January 13 – Bernhard Goetz is sentenced to one year in prison and fined $5,000 for shooting four young men on the New York subway in 1984.
 January 16 – A Hispanic Miami police officer shoots and kills a speeding black motorcyclist in the Overtown section of Miami, Florida, starting three days of rioting.
 January 17 – Stockton massacre: Patrick Edward Purdy kills five children, wounds 30 and then shoots himself in Stockton, California.
 January 18 – The Republican National Committee elects Lee Atwater as its chairman.
 January 20 – George H. W. Bush is sworn in as the 41st President of the United States, and Dan Quayle is sworn in as Vice President of the United States.
 January 22 – The San Francisco 49ers defeat the Cincinnati Bengals in Super Bowl XXIII.
 January 24 
Serial killer Theodore Bundy is executed in Florida's electric chair.
Joel Steinberg is convicted of manslaughter in the beating death of a 6-year-old child he was raising.
 January 29 – Shining Time Station, a children's sitcom debuts on PBS. Starring Didi Conn, Brian O'Connor and Ringo Starr, the series introduces British children's television series Thomas the Tank Engine & Friends to America.
 January 31 – Northway, Alaska records the highest mean sea level pressure on record in the United States with a reading of 31.85 inHg (1078.6 millibars)

February
 February 7 
The Los Angeles, California City Council bans the sale or possession of semiautomatic weapons.
The 101st United States Congress rejects a proposed 51 percent pay raise for its members, federal judges, and certain other high-ranking government officials.
 February 10
Ron Brown is elected chairman of the Democratic National Committee, becoming the first African American to lead a major United States political party.
 President Bush meets with Prime Minister of Canada Brian Mulroney in Ottawa, laying the groundwork for the Acid Rain Treaty of 1991.
 February 11 – Barbara Harris is the first woman consecrated as a bishop of the Episcopal Church in the United States of America.
 February 14 – The first of 24 Global Positioning System satellites is placed into orbit.
 February 23 – After protracted testimony, the U.S. Senate Armed Services Committee rejects, 11–9, President Bush's nomination of John Tower for Secretary of Defense.
 February 23–27 – U.S. President Bush visits Japan, China, and South Korea, attending the funeral of Hirohito and then meeting with China's Deng Xiaoping and South Korea's Roh Tae-woo.
 February 26 – 60 Minutes in the United States airs a report claiming that apples sprayed with Alar may cause cancer in children, leading many schools to remove apples from their cafeterias.

March

 March – The unemployment rate drops to a low of 5.0%, the lowest since December 1973.
 March 1
 The Berne Convention, an international treaty on copyrights, is ratified by the United States.
 Louis Wade Sullivan starts his term of office as U.S. Secretary of Health and Human Services.
 James D. Watkins starts his term of office as U.S. Secretary of Energy.
 March 3 – Former National Security Advisor Robert McFarlane is fined $20,000 and given two years' probation for misleading Congress about the Iran–Contra affair.
 March 4
Time, Inc. and Warner Communications announce plans for a merger, forming Time Warner.
Eastern Air Lines machinists and baggage workers walk off the job to protest pay cuts. The airline subsequently filed for bankruptcy protection five days later, on March 9.
 March 9 – By a vote of 53 to 47, the Senate votes to reject the nomination of John Tower as United States Secretary of Defense.  President Bush subsequently nominated Dick Cheney the next day, and Cheney was confirmed and sworn in as defense secretary on March 17.
 March 13 – A geomagnetic storm causes the collapse of the Hydro-Québec power grid. 6 million people are left without power for 9 hours. Some areas in the northeastern U.S. and in Sweden also lose power, and aurorae are seen as far as Texas.
 March 13–17 – The Food and Drug Administration bans the import of grapes from Chile after traces of cyanide are found in two grapes.
 March 13–18 – The Space Shuttle Discovery flies mission STS-29.
 March 14 – Gun control: U.S. President George H. W. Bush bans the importation of certain guns deemed assault weapons into the United States.
 March 20 – Dick Cheney is sworn in as the new Secretary of Defense, succeeding Frank Carlucci.
 March 22
 Congress passes a bill to protect the job of whistle blowers who expose government waste or fraud.
 National Football League commissioner Pete Rozelle, commissioner since 1960, announces he will step down when a replacement is found.
 Clint Malarchuk of the NHL Buffalo Sabres suffers an almost fatal injury when another player accidentally slits his throat.
 March 23 – Stanley Pons and Martin Fleischmann announce that they have achieved cold fusion at the University of Utah.
 March 24 – Exxon Valdez oil spill: In Alaska's Prince William Sound the Exxon Valdez spills  of oil after running aground.
 March 29 – The 61st Academy Awards, the first since 1971 with no official host are held at the Shrine Auditorium in Los Angeles, California, with Barry Levinson's Rain Man winning four awards out of eight nominations, including Best Picture and Best Director. The television broadcast is the most-viewed in Oscar history until 1998, garnering nearly 43 million viewers.

April
 April 1 – Bill White becomes president of baseball's National League, becoming the first African American to head a major sports league.
 April 3
The Michigan Wolverines men's basketball team defeats the Seton Hall Pirates men's basketball team to win the 1989 NCAA Men's Division I Basketball Tournament. 
Richard M. Daley is elected Mayor of Chicago.
 April 5 – Beginning of the Pittston Coal strike after miners had worked 14 months without a contract.
 April 9 – More than 300,000 demonstrators march in Washington, D.C. in support of legal abortion in the United States.
 April 14 – The U.S. government seizes the Irving, California Lincoln Savings and Loan Association; Charles Keating (for whom the Keating Five were named – John McCain among them) eventually goes to jail, as part of the massive 1980s Savings and Loan Crisis which costs U.S. taxpayers nearly $200 billion in bailouts, and many people their life savings.
 April 15
The Tiananmen Square protests begin.
 April 17 – The House Committee on Standards of Official Conduct charges House Speaker Jim Wright with improperly evading limits on outside income and accepting improper gifts.
 April 19
 Trisha Meili is attacked while jogging in New York City's Central Park; as her identity remains secret for years, she becomes known as the "Central Park Jogger."
 A gun turret explodes on the U.S. battleship Iowa, killing 47 crew members.
 April 20 – NATO debates modernizing short range missiles; although the U.S. and U.K. are in favor, West German Chancellor Helmut Kohl obtains a concession deferring a decision.

May
 May 1 – Disney-MGM Studios at Walt Disney World opens to the public for the first time.
 May 4
 In the trial of Oliver North on charges related to the Iran–Contra affair, the jury finds North guilty of three criminal charges and not guilty of nine.
 STS-30 was launched, deploying the Venus-bound Magellan probe.
 May 8 – STS-30 lands at Edwards Air Force Base in California after four days of its mission and the successful deployment of a Venus spacecraft.
 May 12 – A Southern Pacific Railroad freight train crashes on Duffy Street in San Bernardino, California.
 May 15-25 – Los Angeles schoolteachers go on strike. The strike ends with the teachers gaining more administrative control and a 24% pay raise.
 May 19 – The Dow Jones Industrial Average closes above 2,500 for the first time since  Black Monday (1987).
 May 25 – Thirteen days after the Southern Pacific train derailment, the Calnev Pipeline explodes at the same section of Duffy Street in San Bernardino, California.
 May 26 – United States House of Representatives Majority Whip Tony Coelho resigns from the United States House of Representatives, saying he wants to spare his family from an investigation into his finances.
 May 31 – Jim Wright announces his resignation as Speaker of the House of Representatives.

June
 June 4
– Jerome Robbins' Broadway wins the Tony Award for Best Musical and five other Tonys.
The Tiananmen Square protests end.
 June 6 – The United States House of Representatives elects Tom Foley as its new speaker.
 June 12 – The Corcoran Gallery of Art cancels Robert Mapplethorpe's photography exhibition, "Robert Mapplethorpe: The Perfect Moment", due to its sexually explicit content.
 June 13
The Detroit Pistons beat the Los Angeles Lakers to win the 1989 NBA Finals.
President Bush vetoes a minimum-wage bill passed by Congress on May 17 that would have increased the minimum wage to $4.55 an hour.
 June 14 – A Titan IV blasts off from Cape Canaveral Air Force Station.
 June 21 – In Texas v. Johnson, the United States Supreme Court rules that burning the Flag of the United States is protected speech under the First Amendment to the United States Constitution.
 June 23 – The film Batman opens on general release, earning more than $40 million in its first weekend, a box office record.
 June 23-24 – Three shipping accidents in a 12-hour period create oil spills in Rhode Island, Delaware and Texas.
 June 26 – In Penry v. Lynaugh, the Supreme Court rules that states can execute murderers as young as 16 or who are [[Mental challenged [mentally challenged]].
 June 27 – A federal appeals court overturns the February 1988 conviction of Lyn Nofziger for illegal lobbying.

July
 July 3 – In Webster v. Reproductive Health Services, the Supreme Court gives the states new authority to restrict abortions.
 July 5
 The television show Seinfeld premieres.
 Oliver North is fined $150,000, and given a two-year suspended sentence and three years probation and ordered to perform 1,200 hours of community service for his crimes in the Iran-contra affair.
 July 9–12 – U.S. President George H. W. Bush travels to Poland and Hungary, pushing for U.S. economic aid and investment.
 July 17 – Maiden flight of the B-2 stealth bomber.
 July 18 – Actress Rebecca Schaeffer is murdered by an obsessed fan, leading to stricter stalking laws in California.
 July 19 – United Airlines Flight 232 (Douglas DC-10) crashes in Sioux City, Iowa, killing 112; 184 on board survive.
 July 21 – The Dow Jones Industrial Average closes above 2,600 for the first time since Black Monday (1987).
 July 26 – A federal grand jury indicts Cornell University student Robert Tappan Morris, Jr. for releasing a computer virus, making him the first person to be prosecuted under the 1986 Computer Fraud and Abuse Act.
July 31 – Nintendo's Game Boy is released in North America.

August
 August 5 – Congress passes the Financial Institutions Reform, Recovery, and Enforcement Act of 1989, which is signed into law by President Bush on August 9. The act provides a $166-billion bailout to failed savings and loans and overhauls regulation of the industry.
 August 7 
U.S. Representative Mickey Leland (D-TX) and 15 others die in a plane crash in Ethiopia.
Federal Express purchases Flying Tiger Line for approximately 800 million U.S. dollars.
 August 8 – STS-28: Space Shuttle Columbia takes off on a secret 5-day military mission.
 August 10 – President Bush nominates United States Army Gen. Colin Powell as Chairman of the Joint Chiefs of Staff, making him the first African American to hold that position.
 August 16–17 – Woodstock '89 festival.
 August 20 – In Beverly Hills, California, Lyle and Erik Menendez shoot their wealthy parents to death in the family's den.
 August 22 – Nolan Ryan becomes the first pitcher in the history of Major League Baseball to get 5,000 strikeouts.
 August 23 – Yusef Hawkins is shot in the Bensonhurst section of Brooklyn, New York, sparking racial tensions between African Americans and Italian Americans.
 August 24
Record-setting baseball player Pete Rose agrees to a lifetime ban from the sport following allegations of illegal gambling, thereby preventing his induction into the Baseball Hall of Fame.
The Dow Jones Industrial Average ends the day at 2,734.64, its highest closing since Black Monday (1987).
 August 27 – A Delta II rocket owned by McDonnell Douglas launches a television satellite, the first time a privately owned rocket had orbited a payload.
 August 29 – Harry Zych, a diver and salvager, files a lawsuit to gain ownership of the wreck of the Lady Elgin which he has recently discovered in Lake Michigan in Highland Park, Illinois.

September
 September 1 – Commissioner of Baseball A. Bartlett Giamatti dies of a heart attack.  On September 13, club owners elect Fay Vincent as his successor.
 September 2–3 – Fraternity members attending the Greekfest fraternity festival in Virginia Beach, Virginia spend two days rioting and looting.
 September 5 – U.S. President George H. W. Bush holds up a bag of cocaine purchased across the street at Lafayette Park, and proposes to spend $7.9 billion in the War on Drugs, in his first televised speech to the nation.
 September 8 – Former president Ronald Reagan undergoes surgery to remove fluid on his brain. He recovers quickly.
 September 14 – Standard Gravure shooting: Factory worker Joseph Wesbecker kills 8 and injures 12 before committing suicide inside a factory in Louisville, Kentucky.
 September 21 – Hurricane Hugo makes landfall in South Carolina, causing $7 billion in damage.
 September 27–28 – President Bush and the governors of the 50 U.S. states meet at the University of Virginia to discuss education policy.
 September 28 – Braniff Incorporated files for bankruptcy for the second time since 1982.
 September 28 – Former Philippines President Ferdinand Marcos dies in an inter-organ failure at his hospital in Honolulu, Hawaii, United States.
 September 29 – In the biggest narcotics seizure on record, drug agents confiscate 21.4 short tons of cocaine and more than $12 million in cash from a Los Angeles warehouse.

October

 October 4 – More than 55,000 Boeing machinists go on strike. They return to work on November 22 after winning higher pay.
 October 5 – A jury in Charlotte, North Carolina convicts televangelist Jim Bakker of fraud and conspiracy. On October 24, he is sentenced to 45 years in prison and fined $500,000.
 October 9 – The Dow Jones Industrial Average closes at a record high of 2,791.41.
 October 12 
 The Dallas Cowboys and the Minnesota Vikings complete the Herschel Walker trade.
 Congress passes the Flag Protection Act of 1989, which Bush allows to become law without his signature on October 28.
 October 13 – Friday the 13th mini-crash: The Dow Jones Industrial Average plunges 190.58 points, or 6.91 percent, to close at 2,569.26, most likely after the junk bond market collapses.
 October 15 – Wayne Gretzky becomes the leading scorer in the history of the National Hockey League.
 October 17 – The 6.9  Loma Prieta earthquake shakes the San Francisco Bay Area and the Central Coast with a maximum Mercalli intensity of IX (Violent). Sixty-three people were killed and damage amounted to $5.6–6 billion.
 October 18 – STS-34 is launched, deploying the Jupiter-bound Galileo probe.
 October 19 – The Wonders of Life pavilion opens at Epcot in Walt Disney World, Florida.
 October 20
 The Senate convicts Judge Alcee Hastings of the United States District Court for the Southern District of Florida of perjury and conspiracy to obtain a bribe, and removes him from office.
 A federal jury in New York City convicts Rep. Robert García of extortion and conspiracy.
 October 23
 The Phillips Disaster in Pasadena, Texas kills 23 and injures 314 others.
 STS-34 lands at Edwards Air Force Base in California after five days of its mission and the successful deployment of a Jupiter-bound spacecraft.
 Congress fails to override Bush's veto of a bill that would have restored funding for abortions for poor women who were the victims of rape or incest.
 October 26 – NFL owners elect Paul Tagliabue as NFL commissioner.
 October 28 – The Oakland Athletics beat the San Francisco Giants to win the 1989 World Series.

November
 November 2 – North Dakota and South Dakota celebrate their 100th birthdays.
 November 3 – The Senate convicts Judge Walter Nixon of the United States District Court for the Southern District of Mississippi of lying under oath to a federal grand jury and removes him from office.
 November 7 
Douglas Wilder wins the Virginia governor's race, becoming the first elected African American governor in the United States.
David Dinkins becomes the first African American mayor of New York City.
 November 8 – Congress passes legislation to raise the minimum wage from $3.35 to $4.25 an hour by April 1991. Bush signs this bill on November 17.
 November 9 – The Berlin Wall is brought down.
 November 15 – Lech Walesa, leader of Poland's Solidarity movement, addresses a Joint session of the United States Congress.
 November 15–16 – November 1989 tornado outbreak: Tornadoes in the Eastern United States kill at least 31 people.
 November 16
 Six Jesuit priests—among them Ignacio Ellacuría, Segundo Montes, and Ignacio Martín-Baró—their housekeeper, and her teenage daughter, are murdered by U.S. trained Salvadoran soldiers.
 The House of Representatives passes amendments to strengthen the Ethics in Government Act of 1978; the Senate passes its own amendments the next day.
 November 17 – Walt Disney Feature Animation's 28th feature film, The Little Mermaid, is released to critical acclaim and is one of Disney's biggest financial successes at the time. After the success of 1986's The Great Mouse Detective and the 1988 Disney/Amblin live-action/animated film Who Framed Roger Rabbit, the film is given credit for breathing life back into the art of Disney animated feature films after some prior films produced by Disney were struggling. It also marks the start of the era known as the Disney Renaissance.
 November 19 – United States Soccer Team qualified to the 1990 FIFA World Cup after 40 years of absences, beating Trinidad & Tobago 1-0 in Port Spain, The goal scored by Paul Caligiuri was named as:Shot heard round the world
 November 21 – North Carolina celebrates its bicentennial statehood.
 November 22
 Congress repeals the Medicare Catastrophic Coverage Act of 1988.
 The Space Shuttle Discovery begins STS-33.

December

 December 2 – The Solar Maximum Mission research satellite, launched in 1980, crashes back to earth.
 December 3 – Cold War: In a meeting off the coast of Malta, U.S. President George H. W. Bush and Soviet leader Mikhail Gorbachev release statements indicating that the Cold War between their nations may be coming to an end.
 December 7 – A Miami, Fla. jury convicts police officer William Lozano for the January 16 deaths of a black motorcyclist and his passenger.
 December 12 – Hotelier Leona Helmsley is sentenced to four years in prison and fined $7.2 million for tax evasion.
 December 16–18 – Mail bombings kill a federal judge in Birmingham, Alabama and a lawyer in Savannah, Georgia.
 December 17 – The television show The Simpsons premiers on FOX.
 December 20 – Operation Just Cause is launched in an attempt to overthrow Panamanian dictator Manuel Noriega.

Ongoing
 Cold War (1947–1991)

Undated
 Alliance of Independent Academic Medical Centers is established.
 TM Capital Corp. is founded.

Births

January

 January 3
 Christian Ballard, football player
 Bryan Burke, soccer player
 Alex D. Linz, actor
 January 4
 Joe Barksdale, singer/songwriter and football player
 Sessilee Lopez, model
 Kevin Pillar, baseball player
 Graham Rahal, race car driver
 January 6 
 James Durbin, singer
 Derrick Morgan, football player
 January 8
 Jessica Beard, sprinter
 Steven Christopher Parker, actor
 January 9 – Michael Beasley, basketball player
 January 10
 Marvin Austin, football player
 Conor Dwyer, Olympic swimmer
 Emily Meade, actress
 January 13
 Andy Allo, Cameroonian-born singer/songwriter, guitarist, and actress
 Bryan Arguez, football player
 James Bird, Welsh-born rugby player
 Morgan Burnett, football player
 Beau Mirchoff, American-born Canadian actor  
 January 15
 Kaveh Akbar, Iranian-born poet and scholar
 Kelci Bryant, Olympic diver
 Keiffer Hubbell, ice dancer
 Tasha Reign, pornographic actress, nude model, stripper, producer, and sex columnist
 Nicole Ross, Olympic foil fencer
 January 16
 Charlie Buckingham, Olympic sailor
 Yvonne Zima, actress
 January 17
 Byron Bell, football player
 Blake Beavan, baseball player
 Kelly Marie Tran, actress
 January 18
 Rich Balchan, soccer player
 Steven Bohlemann, Paralympic soccer player
 January 19
 John Albert, ice hockey player
 Dustin Poirier, mixed martial artist
 January 21 – Kayla Banwarth, volleyball player and coach
 January 22
 Brad Bolen, judoka
 Nick Simmons, actor and singer
 January 23 – James Aiono, football player
 January 24 – Chris Banchero, American-born Filipino basketball player
 January 25
 Vincent Brown, football player
 Kevin Burwell, basketball player
 January 26
 MarShon Brooks, basketball player
 Emily Hughes, Olympic figure skater
 January 27
 Dyllón Burnside, actor and singer
 Brooke Butler, actor
 January 29
 Maikon Bonani, football player
 Troy Brewer, basketball player
 January 30
 Jahvid Best, football player and Olympic track and field athlete representing St. Lucia
 Thomas Biesemeyer, Olympic alpine skier
 Jonathon Blum, ice hockey player
 Kylie Bunbury, Canadian-born actress
 Keith Butler, baseball player
 Khleo Thomas, actor and rapper
 January 31
 Coady Andrews, soccer player
 Joanna Atkins, sprinter

February

 February 1 – Sara Jacobs, politician
 February 2 – Harrison Smith, football player
 February 3 – Ryne Sanborn, hockey player and actor
 February 4
 Victor Aiyewa, football player
 Lavoy Allen, basketball player
 February 5
 Mew2King, esports athlete
 Jeremy Sumpter, actor
 February 6 – Randall Burden, football player
 February 7 – Isaiah Thomas, basketball player
 February 8  
 JaJuan Johnson, basketball player
 Julio Jones, football player
 Courtney Vandersloot, basketball player
 February 9 – Mike Brown, football player
 February 10 – Chas Alecxih, football player
 February 11 – Brian Brikowski, football player
 February 13 – Katie Volding, actress
 February 14 – Chazz Anderson, football player
 February 15
 Matt Balasavage, football player
 Bonnie Dennison, actress
 February 16 – Elizabeth Olsen, actress
 February 17 – Chord Overstreet, actor and singer
 February 18 – Whitney Ashley, Olympic discus thrower
 February 19
 Danielle Adams, basketball player
 Robyn Adele Anderson, singer and actress
 Matt Hamilton, Olympic curler
 February 20
 Nate Bussey, football player
 Jack Falahee, actor
 February 21
 Jake Bequette, football player and political candidate
 Corbin Bleu, actor, model, dancer, film producer, and singer/songwriter
 Kristin Herrera, actress
 Scout Taylor-Compton, actress
 February 22 – Chris Bassitt, baseball player
 February 23 
 Evan Bates, Olympic ice dancer
 Chris Conte, football player
 February 24
 Jacqueline Alemany, journalist and political reporter
 Brian Bell, wheelchair basketball player
 Ammar Campa-Najjar, politician
 Trace Cyrus, musician and guitarist for Metro Station
 Kosta Koufos, Greek-born basketball player
 February 26 – Courtney LaPlante, American-born Canadian singer and vocalist for Iwrestledabearonce (2012-2015) and Spiritbox (2016-present)
 February 27 – Stefano Langone, singer
 February 28 – Chad Bell, baseball player

March

 March 1
 Sonya Kitchell, singer/songwriter
 Daniella Monet, actress and singer
 March 3
 Val Astaire, pop singer/songwriter
 Seth Blair, baseball player
 Marcus Boyd, sprinter
 John Brantley, football player
 D. J. Bryant, football player
 March 4 – Erin Heatherton, fashion model  
 March 5
 Jake Lloyd, actor
 Sterling Knight, actor
 March 6
 Colin Briggs, lacrosse player
 Stephanie Brombacher, softball player
 Josh Bush, football player
 Dwight Buycks, basketball player
 Tabitha Peterson, Olympic curler
 March 7 – Gerald Anderson, Filipino-born actor
 March 8 – Drayson Bowman, ice hockey player
 March 10 – Nina Jankowicz, researcher and author, head of the U.S. Disinformation Governance Board
 March 11 – Anton Yelchin, Russian-born Actor (d. 2016)
 March 12 – Tyler Clary, Olympic swimmer
 March 13 – Joshua Allen, dancer and So You Think You Can Dance winner
 March 14 – Colby O'Donis, singer
 March 15
 Brandon Barden, football player
 Ben Blood, ice hockey player
 LaVon Brazill, football player
 Jordan Feliz, Christian singer/songwriter
 Gil Roberts, Olympic printer
 Caitlin Wachs, actress
 March 16
 Michael Blazek, baseball player
 Shannon Breen, football player
 Brian M. Rosenthal, investigative journalist
 Blake Griffin, basketball player
 March 17
 Bront Bird, football player
 Mason Musso, musician and singer/songwriter
 Ronnie Canizaro, singer and frontman for Born of Osiris
 March 18
 Jonathan Ahdout, actor
 Lily Collins, British-born actress
 March 19
 Ben Briley, singer
 Vincent Hancock, Olympic skeet shooter
 March 20
 Heather Bergsma, Olympic speed skater
 Tommy Ford, Olympic Alpine skier
 March 21
 Matt Blanchard, football player
 Bryan Bulaga, football player
 March 22
 Broderick Adé Hogue, art director, designer, and letterer (d. 2021)
 Tyler Oakley, YouTube and podcast personality
 Karen Rodriguez, singer
 J. J. Watt, American Football player
 March 25
 James Anderson, basketball player
 Allen Bailey, football player
 Bree Boyce, beauty pageant winner
 Aly Michalka, actress and singer
 March 26 – Von Miller, football player
 March 28 – Nick Boulle, racing driver

April

 April 2 – Nicole Baukus, convicted criminal
 April 3 – T. J. Brennan, ice hockey player
 April 5 – Audrey Bolte, beauty pageant winner
 April 8 – Nicholas Megalis, singer/songwriter
 April 9
 Bianca Belair, pro wrestler
 Danielle Kahle, figure skater
 April 10
 Valerie Arioto, softball player
 Richard Helms, businessman
 Juice Robinson, pro wrestler
 April 11
 Blake Brettschneider, soccer player
 Zola Jesus, singer
 April 12 – Greg Blum, soccer player
 April 13
 Ryan Bailey, Olympic sprinter
 Anamika Bhargava, tennis player
 April 14 – Joe Haden, football player
 April 16
 Baths, musician
 Mia Yim, wrestler
 April 17
 Darius Adams, American-born Bulgarian basketball player
 Beau Knapp, actor
 April 18
 Don Barclay, football player
 Jessica Jung, American-born Korean singer
 Alia Shawkat, actress
 April 19
 Tori Anthony, pole vaulter
 Ashley Everett, dancer and actress
 April 20
 Shane Bannon, football player
 Nina Davuluri, public speaker and advocate
 Han Hee-jun, Korean-American singer
 April 21 – Tatyana McFadden, Russian-born paralympian athlete
 April 22
 DeJuan Blair, basketball player
 Chance Barrow, wrestler
 April 23
 Anastasia Baranova, Russian-born actress
 Kate Buesser, ice hockey player
 April 24
 David Boudia, Olympic diver
 Thomas Sanders, influencer
 April 25 – Joe Bendik, soccer player
 April 26
 Cole Beasley, football player
 Chad Bettis, baseball player
 April 27
 La'Shard Anderson, basketball player
 Martha Hunt, model
 Emily Rios. actress
 April 28
 Kenjon Barner, football player
 Stephen Ettinger, mountain biker
 April 29 – Candace Owens, conservative author, talk show host, political commentator, and activist
 April 30
 Armando Allen, football player
 Baauer, record producer and DJ

May

 May 1
 Denzel Bowles, basketball player
 Tim Urban, actor, singer/songwriter, and American Idol, contestant
 May 2
 Graham Alexander, singer/songwriter, entertainer, and entrepreneur
 Tommy Brenton, basketball player
 May 3
 Anya Alvarez, golfer and writer
 Bryan Barberena, mixed martial artist
 Brandon Bostick, football player
 May 4
 Greg Casar, politician
 James van Riemsdyk, hockey player
 May 5 – Chris Brown, singer and actor
 May 6 – Anna Paulina Luna, Air Force veteran and politician
 May 7 – Earl Thomas, football player
 May 8
 Andrew Blaser, Olympic skeleton racer
 Brandon Bogotay, football player
 Nyle DiMarco, model and activist
 Reckful, Twitch streamer (d. 2020)
 May 9
 Becca, singer/songwriter and guitarist
 Clint Boling, football player
 May 10
 Drew Butler, football player
 Marisha Ray, voice actress
 Lindsey Shaw, actress
 Jesse Vargas, boxer and political candidate
 Gabrielle Walsh, actress
 May 11
 David Buchanan, baseball player
 Pratyush Buddiga, New Zealand-born poker player
 Tyler Carron, Paralympic ice sled hockey player
 Cam Newton, football player
 Prince Royce, singer/songwriter
 May 12
 Nick Bellore, football player
 Kylee Botterman, gymnast
 May 14 – Rob Gronkowski, football player
 May 15 – Sunny Lee, American-born Korean singer
 May 16 – Bill Bentley, football player
 May 17 – Olivia Luccardi, actress and producer
 May 18
 Fatima Ali, Pakistani-born chef (d. 2019)
 Nathan Bartholomay, Olympic pair figure skater
 Alan Becker, online animater and YouTuber
 Josh Bellamy, football player
 Leif Nordgren, Olympic biatlete
 May 19 – Gaelan Connell, actor and musician
 May 20 – Grant Amato, convicted murderer
 May 21 – Rodney Bartholomew, basketball player
 May 22
 Drake Britton, baseball player
 Trevor Reckling, baseball player
 May 24
 G-Eazy, hip-hop rapper and producer
 Lelia Broussard, musician and member of Jupiter Winter
 Kalin Lucas, basketball player
 Tara Correa-McMullen, actress (died 2005) 
 Sarah Reich, tap dancer 
 May 26 – Chad Billins, ice hockey player
 May 28 – Isaac Butts, basketball player
 May 29
 Ezekiel Ansah, Ghanaian-born football player
 Riley Keough, actress
 Brandon Mychal Smith, actor
 May 30
 Kamar Aiken, football player
 Ailee, Korean-born singer/songwriter
 Greg Billington, Olympic triathlete
 Kevin Covais, actor and singer
 May 31 
 Lauren Barnes, soccer player
 Jordan Bernstine, football player
 Cortlan Brown, racing cyclist
 Noah Gundersen, singer/songwriter and guitarist
 Sean Johnson, soccer player
 Justine Lupe, actress

June

 June 1
 Chaisson Allen, basketball player and coach
 Trey Britton, basketball player
 June 2 
 Freddy Adu, Ghanaian-born soccer player
 Rowan Hisayo Buchanan, writer
 Austin Davis, football player
 Cooper Helfet, football player
 June 3 – Jillette Johnson, singer
 June 4 – Saul Almeida, Brazilian-born boxer and mixed martial artist
 June 5 – Cam Atkinson, hockey player
 June 6
 Prince Amukamara, football player
 Matt Broha, football player
 Dusty Button, ballerina
 June 7 – Ashley Melnick, model and Miss Texas 2010
 June 8 – Kelvin Beachum, football player
 June 9
 Bill Algeo, mixed martial artist
 Logan Browning, actress
 June 10 – DeAndre Kane, basketball player
 June 11
 Cryaotic, Youtuber and internet personality
 Maya Moore, basketball player
 Chris Roettler, singer and frontman for Like Moths to Flames
 June 12
 Dallas Beeler, baseball player
 Jud Birza, model and television personality
 Jeff Brooks, American-born Italian basketball player
 June 13
 Jude Brewer, writer, producer, actor, and podcast host
 Lisa Tucker, singer and actress
 June 14
 Shane Austin, football player
 Peter Avalon, wrestler
 Benjamin Booker, musician, singer/songwriter, and guitarist
 Lucy Hale, actress and singer
 June 15
 Alyssa Farah Griffin, political strategist and TV personality
 Bayley, wrestler
 June 16 – AraabMuzik, record producer and DJ
 June 17
 Simone Battle, actress and singer (died 2014)
 Monica Barbaro, actress
 June 18 – Renee Olstead, actress and singer
 June 20
 Luke Babbitt, basketball player
 Christopher Mintz-Plasse, actor
 Terrelle Pryor, football player
 June 21 – Jamar Abrams, basketball player
 June 22
 Jeshua Anderson, sprinter and hurdler
 Jeffrey Earnhardt, race car driver
 June 23 – Chasten Buttigieg, teacher, writer, and LGBTQ rights advocate
 June 24
 Jamie Blatnick, football player
 Rafi Gavron, English-born actor
 June 25 – Chris Brochu, actor and singer/songwriter 
 June 27 – Kimiko Glenn, actress and singer
 June 28
 Joe Kovacs, Olympic shot putter
 Markiplier, YouTube personality
 Alex T. Marshall, guitarist and pianist for The Cab
 June 29
 Gwen Berry, Olympic hammer thrower
 Sylvia Hoffman, Olympic bobsledder
 June 30 – Adam Bice, football player

July

 July 1
 Kent Bazemore, basketball player
 Brittany Borman, Olympic discus and javelin thrower
 July 2
 Emma Coronel Aispuro, beauty queen
 Dev, pop singer/songwriter
 Michael Dunigan, basketball player
 Alex Morgan, soccer player
 July 3 – Elle King, singer/songwriter and actress
 July 4
 Jabari Blash, baseball player
 Alyssa Miller, model
 July 5
 LaMark Brown, football player
 Sean O'Pry, model
 July 6 – Laith Ashley, model, actor, activist, singer/songwriter, and entertainer
 July 7
 Sam Bell, politician
 Skyler Bowlin, basketball player
 Austin Kerr, bassist for Set It Off
 July 10
 Scott Alexander, baseball player
 Akeem Ayers, football player
 July 11
 Big Swole, wrestler
 Miel Bredouw, comedian, podcaster, and musician
 Shareeka Epps, actress
 David Henrie, actor and director
 July 12
 Tyler Bowen, football coach
 Hilary Knight, Olympic hockey player
 July 13 – Leon Bridges, singer/songwriter and record producer
 July 14
 Andre Branch, football player
 Rob Brantly, baseball player
 Pedro De Abreu, Brazilian-born entrepreneur, educator, and author
 Rolando McClain, football player
 July 15
 David Bakal, soccer player
 Tristan Wilds, actor and singer
 July 16
 Tony Bishop, American-born Panamanian basketball player
 Carlito Olivero, singer
 July 18 – Derek Dietrich, baseball player
 July 19 – James Austin Johnson, comedian and impressionist
 July 21 
 Chelsie Hightower, dancer and choreographer
 Jasmine Cephas Jones, actress
 Rory Culkin, actor
 Narcissa Wright, video game speedrunner
 July 22
 Keegan Allen, actor
 Alex Andrade, politician
 July 23
 Gibson Bardsley, soccer player
 K. J. Wright, football player
 Donald Young, tennis player
 July 24 – Jansen Allen, racquetball player
 July 25 – Andrew Caldwell, actor
 July 26 – Jonathan Dwyer, football player
 July 27 – Mike Brewster, football player
 July 28
 Adrien Broner, boxer
 Matt Brown, football player
 Nick Jackson, pro wrestler
 July 29
 Nick Afanasiev, Russian-born actor
 Marlen Esparza, boxer
 Jake Smollett, actor
 July 31
 Brandon Adams, boxer
 Brandon Burton, football player and coach
 Alexis Knapp, actress and singer
 Aljamain Sterling, mixed martial artist
 Jessica Williams, actress
 Zelda Williams, actress

August

 August 1
 Landry Allbright, actress
 Malcolm Armstead, American-born Kosovan-Romanian basketball player
 Madison Bumgarner, baseball player
 Tiffany Young, American-born Korean singer
 August 3
 Isa Abdul-Quddus, football player
 Josh Boyd, football player
 August 4
 Anita Antoinette, raggae singer/songwriter and television personality
 Jacob Blankenship, American-born Greek basketball player
 Travis Bowen, soccer player
 Taylor Brown, basketball player
 August 5
 Chasen Bradford, baseball player
 Brinson, Christian rapper
 Jessica Nigri, model and actress
 August 7 – DeMar DeRozan, basketball player
 August 8
 Fatima Ali, Pakistani-born chef, restaurateur, and television personality (d. 2019)
 Ken Baumann, actor and author
 Brandon Bing, football player
 Anthony Rizzo, baseball player
 August 9
 Sam Adonis, wrestler
 Dustin Antolin, baseball player
 Meredith Deane, actress
 Jason Heyward, baseball player
 August 10
 Bad Luck Brian, internet personality
 Jon Baldwin, football player
 Alycia Bellamy, singer, actress, and muse
 Elli Burris, soccer player
 August 11 – Monique Burkland, Paralympic volleyball player
 August 12 – Scott Bamforth, basketball player
 August 13 – Forrest Bennett, politician
 August 14 – Brandon Brown, basketball player
 August 15
 Nicholas D'Agostino, motivational speaker, author, coach, radio host, nonprofit founder, and entrepreneur
 Joe Jonas, musician, actor, singer, and member of the Jonas Brothers
 Carlos PenaVega, actor, dancer, and singer
 August 16
 Cedric Alexander, wrestler
 Freddie Gray, African-American man killed by police
 August 18
 Anna Akana, actress, filmmaker, author, and comedian
 Amelia Brodka, Polish-born skateboarder, coach, and president of Exposure Skate Organization
 LaRon Byrd, football player
 August 19
 Brandon Brooks, football player
 Romeo Miller, rapper, actor, entrepreneur and model
 Julianna Peña, mixed martial artist
 August 20
 Aalias, music producer and musician
 Kirko Bangz, rapper  
 August 21
 Ehire Adrianza, Venezuelan-born baseball player
 Hayden Panettiere, actress, singer, and model
 August 22 – Bobby Bollier, swimmer
 August 23 – Trevor Bryan, boxer
 August 24
 J. C. Banks, soccer player
 Josh Bynes, football player
 August 25
 Brent Antonello, actor
 Ryan Benoit, mixed martial artist
 August 26 – James Harden, basketball player
 August 27 – Juliana Cannarozzo, figure skater
 August 28
 Matt Andriese, baseball player
 Cassadee Pope, singer/songwriter and lead singer of Hey Monday
 August 30
 Bebe Rexha, pop singer, rapper, and songwriter
 Billy Burns, baseball player
 Westside Boogie, rapper
 August 31
 Trent Blank, baseball player
 Nate Brakeley, rugby player
 Dezmon Briscoe, football player

September

 September 1 – Bill Kaulitz, German-born singer/songwriter and frontman for Tokio Hotel
 September 2 – Bianca Butler, pair figure skater
 September 4 – Nigel Bradham, football player
 September 5 – Kat Graham, Swiss-born actress, singer, dancer, and model
 September 6
 Jeff Adams, football player
 Kaelin Burnett, football player
 September 7
 Loren Allred, singer/songwriter and actress
 Tim Benford, football player
 Robert Blanton, football player
 Jonathan Majors, actor
 September 8
 Salvijus Bercys, Lithuanian-born chess grandmaster
 Armon Binns, football player
 Avicii, Swedish DJ, remixer and music producer.
 September 9
 Damario Ambrose, football player
 Sean Malto, skateboarder
 September 10 – Sanjaya Malakar, singer
 September 11
 Michele Aquino, Italian-born soccer player
 Angela Bys, volleyball player
 September 12
 Ron Anderson, basketball player
 Kyle Barone, basketball player
 Megan Blunk, wheelchair baasketball player
 Justin Boston, stock car racing driver
 Freddie Freeman, baseball player
 Andrew Luck, football player
 September 14
 Jimmy Butler, basketball player
 Tony Finau, golfer
 Logan Henderson, actor, dancer, singer, and member of Big Time Rush
 Jonathon Simmons, basketball player
 September 15 – BbyMutha, rapper
 September 17
 Tim Abromaitis, basketball player
 Danielle Brooks, actress and singer
 September 19  
 Tyreke Evans, basketball player
 George Springer, baseball player
 September 21
 Phil Bates, football player
 Brianna Buentello, politician
 Jason Derulo, singer
 September 22
 Corey Anderson, mixed martial artist
 Jon Bass, actor
 September 23
 A.J. Applegate, pornographic actress
 Joe Brady, football coach
 Brandon Jennings, basketball player 
 Kevin Norwood, football player
 September 24 – Jake Buchanan, baseball player
 September 27
 Derek Buttles, football player
 Landon Tewers, singer and frontman for The Plot in You
 September 29 – Ian Crawford, musician

October

 October 1
 Lauren Albanese. tennis player
 Brie Larson, actress and singer
 October 3
 Akeem Auguste, football player
 Chase Austin, racing driver
 Johnthan Banks, football player
 Joplo Bartu, football player
 October 4
 Audra the Rapper, rapper, songwriter, and television personality
 Carlon Brown, basketball player
 Dakota Johnson, actress
 Lil Mama, rapper
 Kimmie Meissner, figure skater
 Rich Homie Quan, rapper
 Supa Bwe, hip hop recording artist, producer, and audio engineer
 October 5
 Jackson Anderson, football player
 Jerime Anderson, basketball player
 October 6 – Peter Badovinac, football coach
 October 10
 Austin Block, ice hockey player
 Joey Bradford, BMX racer
 Aimee Teegarden, actress
 October 11
 Brian Arnfelt, football player and lawyer
 Michelle Wie, golfer
 October 12
 Ben Bass, football player
 Beef, rapper
 Dee Bost, American-born Bulgarian basketball player
 DeAndre Brown, football player
 October 13
 Brace Belden, podcaster and union activist
 Alexandria Ocasio-Cortez, politician
 Skyler Page, animator and voice actor
 October 15
 Callie Brownson, football player and coach
 Blaine Gabbert, football player
 Tucker Reed, blogger, author, journalist, and feminist activist
 October 16 – Jack Salvatore Jr., production assistant and actor
 October 17 – Kyle Carpenter, marine, Afghan War veteran, and Medal of Honor Recipient
 October 18
 Carson Blair, baseball player
 Chad Bumphis, football player and coach
 Matthew Centrowitz Jr., Olympic middle-distance runner
 Laci Green, internet feminist
 October 19
 David Bingham, soccer player
 Suleiman Braimoh, Nigerian-born basketball player
 October 21
 Danny Barnes, baseball player
 Damien Berry, football player
 October 22
 Ross Barkan, journalist, novelist, columnist, and essayist
 Marco Restrepo, musician
 Muhammad Wilkerson, football player
 October 23
 Kye Allums, basketball player
 Zach Brown, football player
 October 24
 Ken Brown, basketball player
 T'erea Brown, track and field athlete
 Will Bruin, soccer player
 Eric Hosmer, baseball player
 October 25
 Delvin Breaux, American-born Canadian football player
 Amber English, Olympic skeet shooter
 Marina Keegan, author and journalist
 October 27
 Mark Barron, football player
 Mia Kilburg, Olympic speed skater
 October 30
 Seth Adkins, actor
 Nastia Liukin, Russian-born Olympic artistic gymnast
 October 31
 Gerald Bowman, football player
 Scott McGough, baseball player

November

 November 1 – Derek Ali, mixing engineer
 November 2
 Angel Bunner, softball player
 Katelyn Tarver, singer/songwriter and actress
 November 3
 Jonathon Acosta, politician
 Paula DeAnda, Mexican-born singer
 November 5
 Alvin Alvarez, actor
 Chris Avalos, boxer
 November 4 – Jarrett Boykin, football player
 November 6
 Jozy Altidore, soccer player
 Harry Bush, cricketer
 Aaron Hernandez, football player (d. 2017)
 November 8 – Giancarlo Stanton, baseball player
 November 10 – Conrad Bassett-Bouchard, scrabble player
 November 11 – Adam Rippon, Olympic figure skater
 November 12
 Jana Bieger, German-born gymnast
 Mikhail Varshavski, Russian-American doctor and youtuber
 November 13 – Lane Adams, baseball player
 November 14
 Matthias Bonvehi, soccer player
 T. Y. Hilton, football player
 Stella Maeve, actress
 Jordan Mark Witzigreuter, singer/songwriter
 November 16 – Ryan Anderson, monster truck driver
 November 19
 Brian Logan Dales, singer/songwriter and frontman for The Summer Set
 Tyga, rapper
 November 20
 Zach Anderson, football player
 Erin Blanchard, Olympic trampoline gymnast
 Mama Cax, model and disabled rights activist (d. 2019)
 Cody Linley, actor
 November 21
 Colin Anderson, football player
 Sadie Maubet Bjornsen, Olympic cross country skier
 Justin Tucker, football player
 November 22
 Joe Adams, football player
 Hillary Bor, Kenyan-born Olympic runner
 Alden Ehrenreich, actor
 Candice Glover, singer and actress
 November 23 – Corey Baker, baseball player
 November 25 – William Li, livestreamer
 November 26 – Nickardo Blake, Jamaican-born soccer player
 November 27 – Harry Adams, sprinter
 November 28 – Leonardo Bates, football player
 November 30 – Kimberly Hill, Olympic volleyball player

December

 December 1
 Kelechi Anuna, American-born Nigerian basketball player
 Larry Black, football coach
 December 2
 Auburn, singer/songwriter
 Robert Turbin, football player
 December 4
 Garron DuPree, musician
 Nafessa Williams, actress
 December 5 – Gregory Tyree Boyce, actor
 December 6 – Deshauna Barber, beauty pageant titleholder, motivational speaker, and U.S. Army Captain
 December 8 – Jen Ledger, British-born singer and drummer for Skillet
 December 9 – Eric Bledsoe, basketball player
 December 11
 Jeff Bernat, Filipino-born singer/songwriter and record producer
 Stephen Burton, football player
 December 12
 Janelle Arthur, singer
 Nick Bailen, American-born Belarusian hockey player
 Mike Glennon, football player
 December 13
 Katherine Schwarzenegger, author
 Taylor Swift, country and pop singer/songwriter
 December 15
 Ben Blankenship, Olympic middle-distance runner
 Nichole Bloom, actress and model
 Jeff Wittek, internet personality
 December 16 – Randy Bullock, football player
 December 17
 Frank Alexander, football player
 Taylor York, guitarist for Paramore
 December 18 – Ashley Benson, actress
 December 19 – Isaiah Anderson, football player
 December 20
 John Boyett, football player
 Becky Burke, basketball player and coach
 December 21
 Quinta Brunson, writer, producer, actress, and comedian
 Mark Ingram II, football player
 December 22
 Logan Huffman, actor
 Patrick Kivlehan, baseball player
 Jordin Sparks, singer/songwriter and actress
 December 25 – Blayne Barber, golfer
 December 26 – Bassel Bawji, basketball player
 December 28
 Austin Barnes, baseball player
 Melissa Bolona, actress and model
 Mackenzie Rosman, actress
 December 29
 Drew Barham, basketball player
 Travis Benjamin, football player
 Jane Levy, actress
 Daniel Shaver, man killed by police (died 2016)
 December 30
 Tyler Anderson, baseball player
 Alix Klineman, Olympic beach volleyball player
 Ryan Sheckler, skateboarder
 December 31 – AKINO, American-born Japanese singer/songwriter

Full Date Unknown

 Nicole Addimando, convicted murderer
 Shaindel Antelis, singer/songwriter and actress
 Carter Arey, wheelchair basketball player
 Jamareo Artis, bass guitarist
 American Artist, contemporary artist
 Ben Babbitt, artist and musician
 Daniel Bachman, musician
 Katya Bachrouche, American-born Lebanese Olympic swimmer
 Rachael Bade, journalist
 Sam Bailey, writer, producer, director, and actress
 Ryan Bancroft, conductor
 Leslie Barlow, artist
 Candice Bennatt, lawyer and beauty pageant winner
 Isidore Bethel, American-born French filmmaker
 Stevie Boi, fashion designer and founder of SB Shades
 Annie Booth, jazz pianist
 Katie Bouman, engineer and computer scientist
 Kris Bowers, composer and pianist
 Diedrick Brackens, artist
 Juliette Brindak, businesswoman and co-founder of Miss O & Friends
 Jonathan Daniel Brown, actor and director
 Lex Brown, artist
 Mat Bruso, singer and frontman for Bury Your Dead
 Molly Burhans, cartographer, data scientist, environmental activist, and founder of GoodLands
 Ari Fitz, model, vlogger, television personality, and filmmaker

Deaths
 January 9 – Bill Terry, baseball player and manager (b. 1898)
 January 21 – Billy Tipton, jazz musician (b. 1914)
 January 24 – Ted Bundy, serial killer
 February 18 – Mildred Burke, wrestler and trainer (b. 1915)
 April 12 
 Abbie Hoffman, political activist (b. 1936)
 Sugar Ray Robinson, boxer (b. 1921)
 April 20 – Edward DeSaulnier, American politician (b. 1921)
 April 22 – Henry R. Paige, Marine Corps general (b. 1904)
 April 26 – Lucille Ball, film and television comedy actress and model (b. 1911)
 May 30 – Claude Pepper, U.S. Senator from Florida from 1936 to 1951 (b. 1900)
 July 10 – Mel Blanc, voice actor, actor, radio comedian and recording artist (b. 1908)
 September 28 – Ferdinand Marcos, politician, 10th President of the Philippines (b. 1917)
 October 6 – Bette Davis, screen actress (b. 1908)
 October 25 – Mary McCarthy, novelist, critic and political activist (b. 1912)
 November 5 – Vladimir Horowitz, Ukrainian-born American classical pianist and composer (b. 1903)
 November 19 – Grant Adcox, race car driver (b. 1950)
 December 1 – Alvin Ailey, African American choreographer (b. 1931)

See also
 1989 in American television
 List of American films of 1989
 Timeline of United States history (1970–1989)

References

External links
 

 
1980s in the United States
United States
United States
Years of the 20th century in the United States